Glycerate 2-kinase (D-glycerate-2-kinase, glycerate kinase (2-phosphoglycerate forming), ATP:(R)-glycerate 2-phosphotransferase) is an enzyme with systematic name ATP:D-glycerate 2-phosphotransferase. This enzyme catalyses the following chemical reaction

 ATP + D-glycerate  ADP + 2-phospho-D-glycerate

A key enzyme in the nonphosphorylative Entner-Doudoroff pathway in archaea.

References

External links 
 

EC 2.7.1